Kościerzyna  (Kashubian and Pomeranian: Kòscérzëna; formerly) is a town in Kashubia in Gdańsk Pomerania region, northern Poland, with some 24,000 inhabitants. It has been the capital of Kościerzyna County in Pomeranian Voivodeship since 1999; previously it was in Gdańsk Voivodeship from 1975 to 1998.

Geographical location 

History
The history of the town dates back to the end of the 13th century. The oldest known mention comes from a document from 1284. In 1346 it was granted municipal rights, and in 1398 the settlement obtained the status of a town. The town's name comes from the Old Polish word kościerz, which means "thicket". Kościerzyna was part of medieval Poland, until, in 1310, it was annexed by the Monastic State of the Teutonic Knights. After the Second Peace of Thorn (1466), the town became part of the Kingdom of Poland again. Administratively it was part of the Pomeranian Voivodeship, located in the provinces of Royal Prussia and Greater Poland. It was the seat of local Polish starosts. Kościerzyna was a small town, whose inhabitants made a living from trade, crafts and farming.

The town suffered many times from fire. In 1463 it was first plundered and thereafter burned down completely by Poles during the Thirteen Years' War. In 1626, during the Polish–Swedish War (1626–29), it was completely burned down once more. During the years 1646, 1663 and 1669 it partly burned down, and in 1709 again, entirely.

In the First Partition of Poland in 1772 the town was annexed by Kingdom of Prussia. It was administratively in the newly formed province of West Prussia, where it remained until 1919. The town was subjected to anti-Polish policies, including Germanisation. During the Kashubian diaspora, many families from Kościerzyna, such as the Mrozeks, the Pellowskis and the Eichmans emigrated to the area of Winona, Minnesota, in the United States, beginning in 1859. Despite Germanisation policies, the town was a center of Polish activity in the 19th century. In 1863, volunteers set out from the town to fight in the Polish January Uprising in the Russian Partition of Poland, but few managed to cross the Prussian-Russian border, while many were imprisoned by Prussians. Around 1900, the town had one Protestant church, one Catholic church, a synagogue, a high school, an academy for school teachers, a factory for the production of snuff, several breweries, a refinery, various mills, agriculture and forestry. In the late 19th and early 20th century Poles founded various organizations, including the "Sokół" Polish Gymnastic Society, reading rooms, Bank Ludowy ("People's Bank"), and the Kashubian newspaper Gryf began publishing. Writer and activist Aleksander Majkowski was active in the town.

After Poland regained independence after World War I in 1918, the Polish population made efforts to reintegrate the town with Poland. In January 1919, the Germans sent a unit of 120 soldiers to the town to prevent the outbreak of a Polish uprising. Local activist Tomasz Rogala, who co-founded a secret Polish independence organization, went to the peace conference in Versailles, where he demanded to include the town in reborn Poland. Kościerzyna was finally reintegrated with the Second Polish Republic in January 1920. The construction of the Polish Coal Trunk-Line in the interbellum contributed to the prosperity of Kościerzyna, as the town gained a modern railway connection with Gdynia, Bydgoszcz and Upper Silesia.

World War II

After the invasion of Poland, which started World War II, between 1939 and 1945, it was occupied by Nazi Germany. Poles were subjected to persecution, murders, deportations to Nazi concentration camps, and expulsions (see Nazi crimes against the Polish nation).

In the first weeks of the occupation, in September 1939, the Germans arrested and imprisoned numerous Poles from the town and the surrounding area. About 600 Poles were murdered in the nearby forest, and some were deported to concentration camps.

Between November 6 and 22, 1939, the Germans expelled 2,000 Poles, who were first deported to the temporary concentration camp in Wysin, and then to the so-called General Government. The expulsions continued until March 1944. Among the expellees was Tomasz Rogala, who returned to Kościerzyna after the war, and in the following decades was commemorated with a monument. Poles who refused to sign the Volksliste were arrested and tortured by the Gestapo, some were tortured to death, or murdered, while their families were deported to concentration camps.

Despite this, the Poles managed to organize an underground resistance movement, including the Pomeranian Griffin secret military organization. After World War II the town was restored to Poland.

Number of inhabitants by year

Tourist attractions

 Skansen Parowozownia Kościerzyna (railway museum) located at Towarowa 7 Street.
 Muzeum Ziemi Kościerskiej (regional museum)
 Rynek (Market Square) filled with colourful historic townhouses
 Lake Gałęźne
 Holy Trinity church, Sanctuary of Our Lady of Kościerzyna
 Church of the Lord's Resurrection

Sports

 Kaszubia Kościerzyna - football club
 Manta Kościerzyna - finswimming club

Notable residents

 Stanisław Ernest Denhoff (c.1673–1728), Polish aristocrat, politician and a military commander 
 Hilary Jastak (1914-2000), leading priest 
 Abraham Lissauer (1832–1908), German physician and archaeologist
 Oswald Kohts (1844–1912), German physician and pediatrician
 Gustav Flatow (1875–1945), German gymnast, competed at the 1896 and at the 1900 Summer Olympics
 Aleksander Majkowski (1876-1938), Kashubian writer, poet, journalist, editor, activist and physician
 Hugo Neumann (1882–1962), German jurist, politician of the Free City of Danzig and writer
 Marek Kulas (born 1963), Polish former racing cyclist, won the 1986 Tour de Pologne 
 Marcin Rekowski (born 1978), Polish professional heavyweight boxer
 Rafał Kosznik (born 1983), Polish footballer, over 200 pro games
 Seweryn Kiełpin (born 1987), Polish footballer, over 200 pro games
 Daniel Pek (born 1991), Paralympic athlete from Poland, represented Poland at the 2012 Summer Paralympics
 Sławomir Stolc (born 1993), Polish volleyball player, a member of Poland men's national volleyball team
 Patryk Dobek (born 1994), Polish athlete
 Jan Gierszewski (born 1882-1951) Co founder (Code name Major Rys) of the WW2 secret military organization Kashubian Griffin.

International relations

Kościerzyna is twinned with:

See also
Kościerzyna (PKP station)

Gallery

References

External links
 Municipal website 
 Twin cities of Kościerzyna
 Photogalleries of Kościerzyna's twin cities
Some German-language documents regarding population

Cities and towns in Pomeranian Voivodeship
Kościerzyna County
Pomeranian Voivodeship (1919–1939)
Kashubian-American history